Kwon Hyun-bin (born March 4, 1997), also known by his stage name Viini, is a South Korean singer, rapper, songwriter, model and actor. He is well known for his appearance in reality survival program Produce 101 Season 2 and debuting in former boy group JBJ.

Biography

1997–2016: Early life and career beginnings

Kwon Hyun-bin was born on March 4, 1997, in Seoul, South Korea. He briefly resided in Tokyo, Japan for studies, also joining the baseball team in Aoba-Japan International School. Upon return to South Korea, he studied in Jungkyung High School as an athlete specializing in Fencing, and went on to being selected as a representative for the teens' fencing tournament. Not too long after, Kwon sustained an injury therefore having to give up on fencing and returning to a life of an ordinary high school student.

In 2015, Kwon began his modelling career under YGKPlus, the youngest addition at the time. He appeared on a variety of pictorials, including the May issue of GQ Korea.

2017–present: Rising popularity, solo debut and acting

In April 2017, Kwon appeared on the second installment of Mnet survival program Produce 101. He finished by overall placing 22nd and soon was offered to join project boy group JBJ, consisting of contestants chosen by the viewers. In October 2017, JBJ debuted with their first extended play Fantasy. After seven months, the group's contract came to an end in April 2018. In midst of promotions with JBJ, Kwon appeared on JTBC reality program Live a Good Life alongside labelmates WINNER's Kim Jin-woo and Yoo Byung-jae. Following disbandment, Kwon became a fixed cast member of MBC variety program Dunia: Into a New World.

On February 1, 2019, Kwon joined as a cast member on JTBC's reality show Try It alongside labelmate Yoo Byung-jae. On May 31, Kwon was revealed to be gearing up for a solo debut through YG Entertainment's subsidiary label YGX, followed news of the launch of YouTube channel Kwon Hyunbin Begins where footage of his album preparation, his daily life, and more would be revealed. Kwon made his solo debut on August 19, 2019, with self-composed lead single "Genie" under the stage name Viini. He began promotions with first music show appearance at MBC Show! Music Core on August 24.

Endorsement

South Korean cosmetics brand LiliByRed selected Kwon as an exclusive model on July 20, 2017. A representative from the brand revealed: "Hyun-bin is perfectly compatible with the image of the new product, which is known through Kwon Hyun-bin's lustful lips and refreshing charm." The following year, he was joined by Gugudan's Mina as a modelling partner to increase synergy and strengthen the brand image. On September 15, 2018, he attended a fan meeting held by the cosmetics brand as promotion for the lip products.

Impact and influence
Hyun-bin was awarded with "Account With Most Growth" in South Korea through Instagram in 2017. The significant rise of followers within the year interpreted the impact he had made among the mass public.

Discography

Extended plays

Singles

Soundtrack appearances

Production credits 
All song credits are adapted from the Korea Music Copyright Association's database, unless otherwise noted.

Videography

Music videos

Filmography

Film

Television series

Web series

Television shows

Web shows

Music video appearances

Fan meeting

References

External links 
 Kwon Hyun-bin on YG Entertainment

1997 births
Living people
K-pop singers
South Korean male models
South Korean male singers
South Korean male rappers
Kakao M artists
Produce 101 contestants
South Korean male television actors
South Korean male idols
YG Entertainment artists